Parapara is a coastal location in the Tasman District of New Zealand. It is located near Golden Bay, close to the edge of the Parapara Inlet, between Tākaka and Collingwood.

Māori settlement
The first settlers in the area were Ngāti Tūmatakōkiri, an iwi (tribe) from the Whanganui area that came to Parapara in the 16th century. These Māori settled around the Parapara Inlet. By the early 1800s, Ngāti Apa ki te Rā Tō and Ngāi Tahu had displaced Ngāti Tūmatakōkiri. During the 1820s, Ngāti Tama came from the North Island and displaced the two iwi. During the mid-1830s, the iwi's rangatira, Te Pūoho-o-te-rangi, led further migration of his people from Taranaki to what is now the Tasman District and this resulted in tension. Te Pūoho-o-te-rangi himself moved south and settled at Parapara. From there, he started a raid against Ngāi Tahu in 1836 down the West Coast, across the Haast Pass into Otago, and into Southland, where he was killed by a party led by Tūhawaiki.

Mining history

The first European settlers came to Parapara in 1858. They were gold miners, having come across from the South Island's first payable gold discovery in 1856 in nearby Lightband Gully. In Parapara, they were first working on Richmond Hill and then down Sarah's Saddle. In the early 1860s, most of the miners left when the gold rushes started in Otago and near Hokitika. Some miners stayed on, though, and were mainly working in the Glen Gyle Creek (which flows into the Parapara River, Glen Gyle, and on the Parapara flats.

The Parapara area is rich in several minerals. The district surveyor, Charles Lewis, collected half a ton of minerals for the Colonial and Indian Exhibition held in 1886 in London. Materials collected for this purpose included marble, silver ore, coal, galena, steatite, hematite, sand suitable for making glass, graphite, schorl, and iron pyrite.

Māori had made use of iron ore for making paint. Europeans did the same and in the early 1870s, iron ore from Parapara was shipped to Nelson and turned into paint there. The paint manufacture was undertaken in Parapara from the late 1870s. The machinery was driven by a waterwheel, with the water coming via a  water race from Glen Gyle Creek. A tramway was built to get the ore from the quarry to the plant, and the bagged paint from the plant to the beach. Paint manufacture had stopped by 1922. A major customer for the red paint was the New Zealand Railways Department, which used it for its goods sheds and railway wagons. Other uses were at ship yards, foundries and on farms.

The manner of gold mining changed in the 1890s when mining companies took over, with miners employed on a wage and hydraulic sluicing became the main extraction method. The companies built three dams in the hills behind Parapara to have secure water supply for sluicing: Druggans Dam, Parapara Dam, and Boulder Lake. Druggans Dam is a  reservoir. Parapara Dam is a dam in the Parapara River that was used to sluice the valley of the Glen Gyle Creek; the creek originally flowed into Appos Creek, which in turn drains into the Aorere River, but the miners removed a whole hillside and it now flows into Parapara River.

A gold dredge was brought up from Dunedin to work in the Parapara Inlet. After working for a week or two, the dredge overturned and sank at the mouth of the Parapara River, resulting in a total loss.

Settlement

Early land-based travel in Golden Bay was along the beach. Beacons were installed in 1885 to guide people across the mudflats but only after at least five people had drowned. Crossing of the Parapara Inlet at the mouth was not advised as it was too dangerous. The "inland road", much of which is now State Highway 60, was built in stages between Tākaka and Collingwood. A local contractor won the tender in May 1897 to form that part of the road that ran along the Parapara Inlet for NZ£33.

The authors of a local history book, Between the ports : Collingwood to Waitapu, state that Parapara was "liveliest" around 1900. In 1901, a hall was opened on land granted by a local land owner, with the building paid for by a mining company, some of the main shareholders, and a government subsidy. Premier Richard Seddon and Governor Lord Ranfurly visited Parapara on 18 February 1904, coming over from Collingwood for the day. The official party included Viscount Northland (the governor's son) and Albert Pitt (Attorney-General).

Demographics

It had a population of 96 at the 2018 New Zealand census, an increase of 6 people (6.7%) since the 2013 census, and unchanged since the 2006 census. There were 39 households. There were 48 males and 48 females, giving a sex ratio of 1.0 males per female. The median age was 61.3 years (compared with 37.4 years nationally), with 6 people (6.2%) aged under 15 years, 9 (9.4%) aged 15 to 29, 36 (37.5%) aged 30 to 64, and 45 (46.9%) aged 65 or older.

Ethnicities were 96.9% European/Pākehā, and 9.4% Māori (totals add to more than 100% since people could identify with multiple ethnicities).

Although some people objected to giving their religion, 56.2% had no religion, 25.0% were Christian and 3.1% had other religions.

Of those at least 15 years old, 27 (30.0%) people had a bachelor or higher degree, and 12 (13.3%) people had no formal qualifications. The median income was $25,800, compared with $31,800 nationally. The employment status of those at least 15 was that 30 (33.3%) people were employed full-time, and 12 (13.3%) were part-time.

Parapara is part of the Golden Bay/Mohua SA2 statistical area.

Notes

References

Populated places around Golden Bay / Mohua